"Dreamboat" is a popular music song, the words and music to which were written by Jack Hoffman, (sometimes incorrectly attributed to Al Hoffman).

A version produced by Walter Ridley, and performed by Alma Cogan, reached number 1 in the UK Singles Chart in 1955 for two weeks, and is one of Cogan's best known hits.

References

1955 singles
UK Singles Chart number-one singles
1955 songs